The Blake School is a private, co-ed Montessori school serving pre-school through 8th grade. The school is located in Plantation, Florida. This school is associated with The Blake School (Lake City, Florida).

References

 Broward County Schools

Schools in Broward County, Florida
Private middle schools in Florida
Private elementary schools in Florida
Plantation, Florida
Montessori schools in the United States